Stateline Speedway is a 1/3 mile racetrack in Busti, New York. Len Briggs, Lloyd Williams, Don Frank and Jerry Frank are among the 5 original owners, The First race was held on July 21, 1956. The first feature was won by Emory Mahan driving a 1955 Chevy. It has hosted one NASCAR event on July 16, 1958, where Shorty Rollins won because most of the top drivers didn't make it due to a long rain delay at a previous race. In 2012, it hosted the "Empire 50", a Lucas Oil Late Model Series event. The track has hosted numerous World Of Outlaw Latemodel events. Dick Barton winning the first event and became the first local driver to win a series event. Since then, a number of local Stateline drivers have also went on to win World of Outlaw Latemodel series events. The track has a rich history of curating many national recognized and touring drivers including Chub Frank (Chubzilla), Max Blair, Brian Ruhlman, Dave Hess, and Boom Briggs. The track races Saturday nights April through mid August, and hosts Super Late Models, Rush Crate Late Models, Rush Stock Cars, Pro Stocks, UMP Modified’s, Rush Pro Modified’s and Compacts. The track has seen many upgrades and improvements under the current ownership of the Scott family.

References

External links
 Stateline Speedway

Motorsport venues in New York (state)
Sports venues in Chautauqua County, New York